Lower Sister Lake is a lake located northwest of the hamlet of Raquette Lake, New York. Fish species present in the lake are brook trout, yellow perch, and black bullhead. There is a trail from the east shore of Big Moose Lake. No motors are allowed on this lake.

See also 
 Upper Sister Lake

References

Lakes of Hamilton County, New York
Lakes of New York (state)